Miani is a town in Bhera Tehsil of Sargodha District in Punjab, Pakistan.

History

Miani had a substantial population of Hindus and Sikhs, especially Khatri Kukhrans, before the partition of India. The Khatris  had to leave their ancestral homes and move to India after partition. Pre-partition, there were also many Hindu Brahmin families lived in Miani. After formation of Pakistan, these Sikhs and Hindus were migrated to India and Muslims which were migrated from Indian Punjab were settled here.

Overview
It is about 70 km from Sargodha city. It is situated on the bank of River Jhelum and 16 km from Bhera Motorway Interchange. It is just few kilometers away from Khewra Salt Mines, 
the Pakistan's largest, the world's 2nd largest and the oldest salt mine in the world.

References

Populated places in Sargodha District